F. W. Graham Hill is a Zimbabwean veterinary surgeon and academic. He was Vice Chancellor of the University of Zimbabwe from 1997 to 2002. As a researcher, he published on subjects such as the rabies vaccination  and its epidemiology carcinoma in cattle, snake bites of small animals  and diseases of the small intestines of dogs. His term as Vice-Chancellor was marked by frequent staff strikes and student disturbances, and university and government crackdowns in response. He was accused of intervening in the academic process to favour senior government officials.

Following his 2002 retirement, Prof. Hill took up farming but lost his new farm during fast-track land reform in 2005.

References

Heads of universities and colleges in Zimbabwe
Living people
Zimbabwean farmers
Zimbabwean surgeons
Academic staff of the University of Zimbabwe
Veterinarians from Africa
White Rhodesian people
Year of birth missing (living people)